Killantringan Lighthouse is a lighthouse located near Portpatrick in Dumfries and Galloway, south-west Scotland. The light came into operation in 1900, and served as a waypoint in the North Channel of the Irish Sea. The lighthouse is protected as a category B listed building.

History
Sanction for the Northern Lighthouse Board to build the lighthouse was granted in 1897. It was designed by David Alan Stevenson.  The engineer's report specified a powerful fog signal was also required at the site. The lighthouse entered service on 1 October 1900. The light gave a flashing signal of two flashes in quick succession every  minute. When used, the fog signal was 3 blasts: low, low, high in quick succession every  minutes.

The light was automated in 1988, with the fog signal having been discontinued the previous year. Following a comprehensive review of services by the UK's three General Lighthouse Authorities in 2005, it was decided that Killantringan was surplus to requirements – serving primarily as a waypoint.  The Lighthouse has been fully decommissioned, and along with the Lightkeepers House, is in private ownership

See also

 List of lighthouses in Scotland
 List of Northern Lighthouse Board lighthouses

References

External links

Killantringan Lighthouse

Lighthouses completed in 1900
Lighthouses in Scotland
Category B listed buildings in Dumfries and Galloway
Category B listed lighthouses
Rhins of Galloway